The women's 100m butterfly events at the 2020 World Para Swimming European Open Championships were held at the Penteada Olympic Pools Complex.

Medalists

Results

S9

S10

S13
Final

S14

References

2020 World Para Swimming European Championships